Say Yes to the Dress is an American reality television program.

Other versions of it include:

 Say Yes to the Dress: Atlanta
 Say Yes to the Dress: Australia
 Say Yes to the Dress: UK